Negative checking is a process by which producers of film, television and radio programs will attempt to ensure that the names of fictional characters cannot be confused  with real life people. For instance, during the making of the series Inspector Morse, the producers of the show checked with local police authorities to ensure that the names of characters used in the program could not be confused with individuals in any real life cases. The primary reason for this practice is to prevent any possible legal action for libel which could result. The term is sometimes shortened in program credits to Neg Check.

See also
All persons fictitious disclaimer

References

Tort law
Film and video terminology